The Sheffield Film Cooperative (also known as the Sheffield Women's Film Co-op) were a media co-operative based in Sheffield, England. The group emerged in the early 1970s with a view to highlight particular issues being faced by women at the time but officially formed as the Sheffield Film Co-op (SFC) in 1975. The founding members were Jenny Woodley, Christine Bellamy, Gill Booth and Barbara Fowkes.

Beginnings 
Prior to the formation of SFC, Woodley, Bellamy, Booth and Fowkes had worked on several media outputs of a similar subject matter. In 1971 with support from producer and playwright Dave Sheasby, they produce a six-part series of radio shows called Not a Pretty Face, based the demands of the feminist movement including equal pay, education and job opportunities, free contraception, abortion rights and care for the under 5's.

With the birth of Sheffield Cablevision Woodley, Bellamy, Booth and Fowkes decided they had found a platform for their message and produce two programs: the difficulties of moving around the city with a child in a pushchair and the need for childminders to be registered.

Formation of Sheffield Film Co-op 
It was due to the nature of their next project that the collective of women decided to officially organise themselves as the Sheffield Film Co-op. The group wanted to make a program in defence of abortion at a time where rights we're under threat before parliament.  A Woman Like You, docu-drama came out in 1976  and marked the official beginnings of the Sheffield Film Co-op.

Filmography 
 1991 - Personal Best / Talking Hairs / Running Gay
 1990 - Women Can Make It Work
 1990 - Thankyou That's all I Knew
 1989 - Diamonds in Brown Paper
 1987 - Bringing It all Back Home
 1986 - Let Our Children Grow Tall!
 1986 - For a Living Wage
 1984 - Women of Steel
 1984 - Changing Our Lives - 5 Arches Community Centrey
 1984 - Red Skirts on Clydeside
 1982 - A Question of Choice
 1978 - Jobs for the Girls
 1977 - That's No Lady
 1975 - A Woman Like You

References 

Film production companies of the United Kingdom
Mass media companies of England